The 1996 Women's Volleyball Olympic Qualifier was played by eight countries to determine the last three competing teams for the 1996 Summer Olympics in Atlanta, Georgia. The tournament was held in Tokyo, Japan from May 26 to June 2, 1996. The top-three teams advance to the Olympic Games with one berth guaranteed for an Asian country.

Teams

Round robin

26.05	Ukraine	3-0	Taiwan	45-29	15-12	15-13	15-4 	
26.05	Bulgaria	3-2	Italy	70-57	12-15	13-15	15-8	15-9	15-10
26.05	Japan	3-1	Romania	55-28	10-15	15-5	15-6	15-2
27.05	Croatia	3-2	Bulgaria	61-68	15-12	16-14	8-15	7-15	15-12
27.05	Netherlands	3-0	Taiwan	45-29	15-3	15-5	15-11	
27.05	Italy	3-0	Romania	45-29	15-11	15-8	15-10	
27.05	Japan	3-0	Ukraine	47-27	17-15	15-11	15-1	
28.05	Croatia	3-0	Italy	45-26	15-13	15- 9	15-4	
28.05	Bulgaria	3-0	Taiwan	45-20	15-5	15-9	15-6	
28.05	Ukraine	3-0	Romania	45-17	15-3	15-1	15-13	
28.05	Netherlands	3-1	Japan	55-42	15-10	10-15	15-6	15-11

played at Tokyo
30.05	Ukraine	3-2	Netherlands	69-68	10-15	10-15	15-11	15-10	19-17
30.05	Croatia	3-0	Romania	45-17	15-5	15-5	15-7	
30.05	Italy	3-0	Taiwan	45-16	15-5	15-6	15-5	
30.05	Japan	3-0	Bulgaria	45-23	15-11	15-9	15-3	
31.05	Ukraine	3-0	Bulgaria	45-19	15-4	15-7	15-8	
31.05	Croatia	3-1	Taiwan	66-54	20-22	16-14	15-12	15- 6	
31.05	Netherlands	3-0	Romania	45-22	15-10	15-9	15-3	
31.05	Japan	3-0	Italy	45-11	15-4	15-0	15-7	
01.06	Romania	3-1	Taiwan	61-46	16-17	15-8	15-9	15-12	
01.06	Netherlands	3-0	Bulgaria	45-22	15-7	15-9	15-6	
01.06	Ukraine	3-0	Italy	45-22	15-8	15-8	15-6	
01.06	Japan	3-0	Croatia	45-20	15-10	15-4	15-6	
02.06	Bulgaria	3-0	Romania	45-21	15-10	15-5	15-11	
02.06	Netherlands	3-1	Italy	56-39	15-8	11-15	15-10	15-6
02.06	Croatia	3-2	Croatia	68-56	15-5	15-10	13-15	10-15	15-11
02.06	Japan	3-0	Taiwan	45-27	15-11	15-9	15-7

Final ranking

 Japan, Ukraine and the Netherlands qualified for the 1996 Summer Olympics in Atlanta, Georgia.

Awards

References
 Results

O
V
V
Q
Qualification for volleyball competitions
Vol